Cokeleys is an unincorporated community in Ritchie County, in the U.S. state of West Virginia.

The community was named for Jacob Cokeley.

References 

Unincorporated communities in West Virginia
Unincorporated communities in Ritchie County, West Virginia